The Greens of the Valencian Country (EVPV) is a political party currently active in the Valencian Community founded in November 2004 from the merger of Green Left–Initiative for the Valencian Country (EV–IPV), The Greens branch in the Valencian Community (EV/LV) and Alternative Left of Buñol (IAB). It is currently one of the few parties comprising what remains of the Confederation of the Greens in Spain, together with Tour Madrid–The Greens (GM–LV) and The Greens–Green Option (EV–OV).

References

2004 establishments in Spain
Green political parties in Spain
Political parties established in 2004